Ioan Lupaș (9 August 1880 – 3 July 1967) was a Romanian historian, academic, politician, Orthodox theologian and priest. He was a member of the Romanian Academy.

Biography
Lupaș was born in Szelistye, now Săliște, Sibiu County (at the time part of Austria-Hungary). He attended between 1886 and 1891 the primary school in his home village. In 1892 he started attending the State School in Nagyszeben (Sibiu), but, due to a conflict on national topics with his history teacher Árpád Trompa, he was forced to move (together with his colleague Octavian Goga) to the Andrei Șaguna Orthodox School in Brassó (Brașov), from where he graduated in 1900.

He studied Philosophy and Literature at the University of Budapest on a "Gojdu Foundation" scholarship, graduating in 1904, and received his Ph.D. from the University of Berlin (1905) with the thesis The Romanian Orthodox Church in Transylvania and the Communion with Rome in the 18th Century. Between 1905 and 1909, Lupaș taught Church History and Romanian History at the "Andreian" Institute of Theology in Sibiu and attended Theology courses.

During his studies he made his debut in journalism and co-founded the Romanian-language Luceafărul magazine. In November 1907, Lupaș was brought to trial for seditious libel, being accused of having instigated the peasants to hatred against the landowners, and sentenced to three months imprisonment and a 200 Krone-fine. He served his three month-sentence in Szeged between August and October 1908, forced out of the Institute in 1909, and appointed priest to the Săliște parish.

The Romanian Academy elected him an associate member in 1914 and full member in 1916, at Nicolae Iorga's suggestion. However, due to the war, he managed to deliver his acceptance speech before the Academy on 8 June 1920.

After Romania's entry in World War I on the Allied side, Lupaș was exiled to Sopron County (western Hungary) and placed under house arrest. In 1918, he was elected representative for Săliște in the Great National Assembly of Alba Iulia that declared the Union of Transylvania with the Kingdom of Romania.

Starting with 1919 he became professor at the University of Cluj, teaching Modern History and Transylvanian History until 1946, and in 1920, together with Alexandru Lapedatu, co-founded the National History Institute, located also in Cluj; he also taught Church History at the Theological Academy. Lupaș was elected president of the History Section of ASTRA and, between 1932 and 1935, president of the History Section of the Romanian Academy.

In the interwar period, Ioan Lupaș served in the Chamber of Deputies for several mandates, and as Minister of Health and Social Security in the Alexandru Averescu cabinet (1926–1927), as well as Minister of Culture and Arts in the Octavian Goga cabinet (1937–1938).

Due to his political activity, he was arrested by the communist regime on 5 May 1950 and detained at Sighet Prison until 5 May 1955.

Lupaș died on 3 July 1967 and he was buried at the cemetery next to Cernica Monastery, in Pantelimon.

A high school in Săliște bears his name, and so are elementary schools in Cluj-Napoca and Săliște.

Works
Câteva pagini din trecutul comunei Săliște
Schiță istorică, Sibiu, 1903
Șovinismul confesional în istoriografia românească ardeleană. Studiu critic, Sibiu, 1903
Biserica ortodoxă din Transilvania și unirea religioasă din veacul al XVIII-lea, Budapest, 1904
Contribuții la istoria culturală și politică a epocii lui Șaguna, Sibiu, 1907
Mitropolitul Andrei Șaguna. Scriere comemorativă la serbarea centenară a nașterii lui, Sibiu, 1909
Viața unei mame credincioase: Anastasia Șaguna, Sibiu, 1912
Misiunea episcopilor Gherasim Adamovici și Ioan Bob la Curtea din Viena în anul 1792, Sibiu, 1912
Viața și faptele lui Andrei Șaguna, mitropolitul Transilvaniei, Bucharest, 1913
Principele ardelean Acațiu Barciai și mitropolitul Sava Brancovici. 1658-1661, Bucharest, 1913
Contribuțiuni la istoria românilor ardeleni. 1780-1792, Bucharest, 1915
Episcopul Vasile Moga și profesorul Gheorghe Lazăr, Bucharest, 1915
Din istoricul ziaristicii românești, Arad, 1916, 78 p.
Luptători pentru lumină, Arad, 1916
12 pețitori ai episcopiei transilvane vacante de la 1796 la 1810, Bucharest, 1916
Istoria bisericească a românilor ardeleni, Sibiu, 1918
Mitropolitul Andrei Șaguna, Sibiu, 1921
Andrei Șaguna şi conducătorii "Asociației transilvane" (1861–1922)", Bucharest, 1923Din activitatea ziaristică a lui Andrei Mureșanu, Bucharest, 1925Contribuții la istoria ziaristicii românești ardelene, Sibiu, 1926Lecturi din izvoarele istorice române, Cluj, 1928Istoria unirii românilor, Bucharest, 1937Paralelism istoric, Bucharest, 1937Realități istorice în voivodatul Transilvaniei în secolele XII–XVI, Bucharest, 1938Doctorul Ioan Piuariu Molnar. Viața și opera lui, 1749–1815, Bucharest, 1939Emanuil Gojdu, 1802-1870. Originea și opera sa, Bucharest, 1940Documente istorice transilvane , Cluj, 1940La Transilvania nel quadro geografico e nel ritmo storico rumeno, Bucharest, 1942Zur Geschichte der Rumänen. Aufsätze und Vorträge, Sibiu, 1943O carte de istorie bisericească ilustrată, Bucharest, 1933Manual de istorie a românilor pentru clasa VIII-a secundară, Sibiu, 1944Manual de istoria Bisericii Române pentru clasa a IV-a de liceu'', Craiova, 1944

References

1880 births
1967 deaths
People from Săliște
People from the Kingdom of Hungary
Romanian Austro-Hungarians
Romanian Orthodox priests
People's Party (interwar Romania) politicians
Romanian Ministers of Culture
Romanian Ministers of Health
Delegates of the Great National Assembly of Alba Iulia
Members of the Chamber of Deputies (Romania)
Ethnic Romanian politicians in Transylvania
Romanian magazine editors
Romanian magazine founders
20th-century Eastern Orthodox priests
20th-century Romanian historians
Austro-Hungarian people of World War I
Andrei Șaguna National College (Brașov) alumni
Academic staff of Babeș-Bolyai University
Budapest University alumni
Humboldt University of Berlin alumni
Titular members of the Romanian Academy
Inmates of Sighet prison
Prisoners and detainees of Austria-Hungary
Austro-Hungarian prisoners and detainees
Prisoners and detainees of Romania
Burials at Cernica Monastery Cemetery